General Ahmed Warsame was the Head of the former Somali Military Academy and Somali National Front.

References

Somalian military leaders
Living people
Somali National Front politicians
Year of birth missing (living people)